Riggle is a surname. Notable people with the surname include:

Beth Riggle (born 1987), American Paralympic swimmer
Bob Riggle (born 1944), American football player
Rob Riggle (born 1970), American actor, comedian, and US Marine Corps Reserve officer
Steve Riggle, American pastor